India competed at the 2022 World Aquatics Championships in Budapest, Hungary from 17 June to 3 July.

Diving

India entered one diver.

Men

Open water swimming

India qualified two male and two female open water swimmers.

Men

Women

Swimming

India entered four swimmers.

Men

Women

References

World Aquatics Championships
2022
Nations at the 2022 World Aquatics Championships